Elections were held in Oxford County, Ontario on October 24, 2022, in conjunction with municipal elections across the province. Each municipality will elect a mayor and a local council, plus two city and county councillors from Woodstock. Trustees to the Thames Valley District School Board, London District Catholic School Board, and Conseil scolaire catholique Providence will also be elected. This election is expected to have more candidates than usual, particularly female, due to the launch of Municipal Campaign School Oxford.

Controversy 
In early 2022, the Mayor of Woodstock Trevor Birtch was criminally charged by the London Police for assault, sexual assault, and sexual assault with choking. However, he did not resign from his position. He eventually took a paid leave of absence, and appeared in court on May 2 for the sexual assault with choking charge being dropped to a second sexual assault charge, and the matter was adjourned until June 6. Three additional charges of sexual assault, involving a different victim, were added to his case, which will first be put in court on July 4.

Oxford County Council

Blandford-Blenheim

Mayor

Township Councillors
4 to be elected, electors have multiple votes

East Zorra-Tavistock

Mayor

Deputy Mayor

Township Councillors

Ward 1
2 to be elected

Ward 2

Ward 3
2 to be elected

Ingersoll

Mayor

Deputy Mayor 
Former Ontario NDP candidate for Oxford in the 2022 Ontario general election Lindsay Wilson is challenging incumbent Deputy Mayor Fred Freeman.

Town Councillors
5 to be elected, electors have multiple votes

Norwich

Mayor

Township Councillors

Ward 1

Ward 2

Ward 3

Ward 4

South-West Oxford

Mayor

Township Councillors

Ward 1

Ward 2

Ward 3

Ward 4

Ward 5

Ward 6

Tillsonburg

Mayor

Town Councillors
6 to be elected, electors have multiple votes

Woodstock

Mayor 
Mayor Trevor Birtch seeked re-election. He is currently facing charges for sexual assault.

City-County Councillor
2 to be elected

City Councillor
4 to be elected

Zorra

Mayor

Township Councillors

Ward 1

Ward 2

Ward 3

Ward 4

School Boards

Thames Valley District School Board

London District Catholic School Board

Conseil scolaire catholique Providence

References 

Oxford
Oxford County, Ontario